The 1995 season was the Kansas City Chiefs' 26th in the National Football League (NFL), their 33rd in Kansas City and their 36th overall. The team improved on their 9–7 record from 1994 and finished the regular season with a 13–3 record and the AFC West division championship. However, the Chiefs suffered a devastating loss in the divisional round of the 1995–96 AFC playoffs when placekicker Lin Elliott missed three crucial field goals, allowing the Indianapolis Colts to win 10–7. Due to the retirement of Joe Montana, the Chiefs made a change at the quarterback position, by starting Steve Bono, who started two games in 1994 while Montana was injured.

Offseason

NFL draft

1995 expansion draft

Personnel

Staff

Roster

Season summary
The season began promisingly on September 3 with a convincing 34–10 win over the Seattle Seahawks in Seattle. New Chiefs quarterback Steve Bono passed for 3,121 yards and 21 touchdowns. Fullback Kimble Anders led the team in pass receptions with 55.

In Week Two, the Chiefs battled back from a two-touchdown deficit to defeat the New York Giants in overtime, 20–17 on September 10. A costly interception, penalties, and struggles on third down all led to a 17–3 Giants lead. The Chiefs didn't score a touchdown until 5:03 remained in the game. On the Chiefs' following possession, Bono completed to Danan Hughes with the game-tying score after a 67-yard, 14-play drive that took just 2 minutes and 32 seconds. Lin Elliott booted the game-winning field goal with 7:11 remaining in overtime to give the Chiefs the win. Marcus Allen led the Chiefs with 86 yards rushing and Bono passed for 187 yards.

The win improved the Chiefs record to 2–0. This was the first of three overtime wins for Kansas City at Arrowhead Stadium during the 1995 season, and it set the tone for the team's ability to win tight, close games throughout the regular season.

On September 17, James Hasty picked off a Jeff Hostetler pass and returned it for a touchdown in overtime as the Chiefs beat the Oakland Raiders, 23–17 to go 3–0. The defense would play a key role in Kansas City's success. The team held its opponents to a league-best 241 points and recorded a third-best 47 sacks. Cornerback Dale Carter led the team with 4 interceptions. Rookie kick returner Tamarick Vanover was also spectacular, returning two kickoffs and one punt for scores. Linebacker Derrick Thomas and defensive ends Neil Smith and Dan Saleaumua also shined for the Chiefs' defense.

On October 1, Quarterback Steve Bono ran for a 76-yard bootleg touchdown, accumulating more than 20% of his total career rushing yards in 1 play. The Chiefs won over the Cardinals 24–3.

On October 9, Tamarick Vanover returned a punt 86 yards in overtime to give the Chiefs a 29–23 victory over the San Diego Chargers on Monday Night Football. It was the Chiefs' third overtime win at Arrowhead Stadium during the 1995 season, and was the first time in NFL history that an overtime game had been won on a punt return for a touchdown.

On October 22, the Chiefs beat the Denver Broncos at Mile High Stadium, 21–7. Marcus Allen was again a standout for the offense, gaining 890 yards rushing and scoring 5 touchdowns for the season.

On November 19, the Chiefs won their seventh game in a row, beating the Houston Oilers 20–13 at Arrowhead Stadium, to go 10–1.

On December 24, Tamarick Vanover ran the opening kickoff 89 yards for a touchdown, and the Chiefs defeated the Seahawks, 26–3. They won the AFC West title and finished the regular season with a 13–3 record.

Preseason

Regular season

Schedule

Note: Intra-division opponents are in bold text.

Game summaries

Week 1: at Seattle Seahawks

Week 2: vs. New York Giants

Week 3: vs. Oakland Raiders

Week 4: at Cleveland Browns

Week 5: at Arizona Cardinals

Week 6: vs. San Diego Chargers

Week 7: vs. New England Patriots

Week 8: at Denver Broncos

Week 10: vs. Washington Redskins

Week 11: at San Diego Chargers

Week 12: vs. Houston Oilers

Week 13: at Dallas Cowboys
NFL on Thanksgiving Day

Week 14: at Oakland Raiders

Week 15: at Miami Dolphins

Week 16: vs. Denver Broncos

Week 17: vs. Seattle Seahawks

Standings

Postseason

Schedule

Game summaries

AFC Divisional Playoffs: vs. (5) Indianapolis Colts
Entering the playoffs holding the league's best record and the one seed, the Chiefs played the Indianapolis Colts, who were coming off a dominant 35–20 win against the Chiefs' divisional rival in the San Diego Chargers. Against the Colts, the heavily-favored Chiefs appeared to be in the driver's seat of their own destiny after jumping out to an early 7–0 lead in the first quarter thanks to a Lake Dawson touchdown catch from Steve Bono. It would, however, be the Chiefs' final points they would score of the season, as for the rest of the game, the Colts' defense swarmed Bono, picking him off three times throughout the remainder of the game. Aside from the dominating defensive effort from Indianapolis, the Colts also scored a touchdown of their own off a Jim Harbaugh-Floyd Turner touchdown pass to tie the game at 7–7 going into halftime. For the rest of the game, both offenses were stagnant in the frigid-cold air inside Arrowhead Stadium. While both teams had great opportunities to score, poor special teams performances on both sides would prove to be a hinderance. Despite this, the Colts attained the lead for good in the third quarter off a Cary Blanchard field goal (his only make in three attempts) to make the score 10–7. The aforementioned Colts defense, which had swarmed the Kansas City offense, forced head coach Marty Schottenheimer to make a change at quarterback late in the game, substituting Bono out for Rich Gannon in the fourth quarter after Bono's third interception of the game. However, after Dawson dropped a potential game-winning touchdown pass on the Chiefs' final drive, Schottenheimer opted for Lin Elliott to kick the game-tying field goal. Throughout the game, Elliott had been shaky on field goals, as up until that point he had been 0-2 from 35 and 39 yards. Despite this, he was trotted out to attempt to kick the game into a potential overtime; his third kick, this time from 43 yards, sailed well wide of the uprights, ending the Chiefs' season at a 13–4 record. The Colts, meanwhile, would advance to the AFC Championship Game, though they would lose in a thrilling matchup against the Pittsburgh Steelers.

References

Kansas City Chiefs
Kansas City Chiefs seasons
AFC West championship seasons
Kansas